The Mechilaat Sreekrishna Temple is situated 10 km from Mananthavady, 25 km from Kalpetta and 35 km from Sultan Bathery, in Kerala, India. This temple is a subsidiary part of the Thirunelli Temple and operates under Thirunelli devoswam.

Hindu temples in Wayanad district
Mananthavady Area